Dominic Laurence Graessel, (Lorenz Grässel) S.J. (August 18, 1753 – October 1793) was an American Roman Catholic priest. He was the first German-American to be appointed bishop.

Biography
Lorenz Grässel was born at Ruemannsfelden, Bavaria, on 18 August 1753. He joined the Society of Jesus in Munich and was a novice at the time of its suppression in 1773. He continued his studies at the Seminary of Ingolstadt and was ordained priest for the Archdiocese of Munich.

In 1781 he left his native land for the American mission at the invitation of fellow Jesuit Ferdinand Steinmeyer, commonly referred to as "Father Farmer", who served areas of Pennsylvania, New Jersey, and New York. Sailing from London in August 1781, he arrived in America that October.

In March 1787, Grässel was given charge of the German members of St. Mary's congregation in Philadelphia and of the Catholics scattered through New Jersey, all territories then within the Diocese of Baltimore. He spent six years in Philadelphia and became noted for his learning, zeal, and piety.

When it became necessary to appoint a bishop coadjutor to succeed Bishop John Carroll of Baltimore, the priests of Diocese chose Grässel for the office and the petition for his appointment was formally made to Rome on September 24, 1793. The petition was granted, making Grässel the first German-born Catholic appointed to a bishopric in the United States, though he was never consecrated a bishop. In October 1793 Grässel succumbed to yellow fever contracted while attending the victims of the plague which that year ravaged Philadelphia. The brief naming him titular bishop of Samosata did not arrive until December 8, 1793. News of his death did not reach the Vatican until July 1794.

References

External links
  

1753 births
1793 deaths
Religious leaders from Baltimore
American Roman Catholic priests
18th-century American Jesuits
18th-century German Jesuits
Roman Catholic Ecclesiastical Province of Baltimore
18th-century Roman Catholic bishops in the United States